The 128th Regiment Illinois Volunteer Infantry was an infantry regiment that served in the Union Army during the American Civil War.

Service
The 128th Illinois was organized at Camp Butler, Illinois, and mustered into Union service on November 4, 1862.

The regiment was assigned to District of Columbus, XVI Corps, Department of Tennessee from November 1862 to April 1863.

Losses
The regiment suffered 1 officer and 34 men killed by disease and 700 men by desertion.

Disbanded
Following the Emancipation Proclamation, the regiment suffered 700 desertions. The regiment was disbanded on April 1, 1863, by order the War Department. Citing "an utter want of discipline" in the regiment, Adjutant General Lorenzo Thomas dismissed the regiment's commanding officer Colonel Robert M. Hundley, 29 other officers, and the regimental chaplain, from Union service on April 4.

The few remaining men of the 128th Illinois were consolidated into a detachment under command of First Lieutenants W. A. Lemma, William M. Cooper, and Assistant Surgeon George W. French and reassigned to 9th Illinois Volunteer Infantry Regiment (3 Years).

See also
List of Illinois Civil War Units

References

External links
 128th Illinois Infantry Regiment - Illinois Civil War Project
 128th Regiment Infantry - History, Illinois Infantry
 Illinois Civil War Muster and Descriptive Rolls Database - Illinois State Archives

Units and formations of the Union Army from Illinois
1862 establishments in Illinois
Military units and formations established in 1862
Military units and formations disestablished in 1863